The 2008–09 La Liga season (known as the Liga BBVA for sponsorship reasons) was the 78th since its establishment. Real Madrid were the defending champions, having won their 31st La Liga title in the previous season. The campaign began on 30 August 2008 and ended on 31 May 2009. A total of 20 teams contested the league, 17 of which already contested in the 2007–08 season, and three of which were promoted from the Segunda División. A new match ball – the Nike T90 Omni – served as the official ball for all matches.

On 16 May 2009, after Villarreal's 3–2 victory over Real Madrid, Barcelona were declared champions, their 19th La Liga title, with three matches to play. Lionel Messi received the inaugural LaLiga Award for Best Player from the Liga Nacional de Fútbol Profesional.

Promotion and relegation
Real Zaragoza, Real Murcia and Levante were relegated to the 2008–09 Segunda División after finishing in the bottom three spots of the table at the end of the 2007–08 La Liga. Zaragoza were relegated to the Segunda División after five seasons of continuous membership in the top football league of Spain; Levante returned in Segunda División after two-year tenured in La Liga; and Murcia made their immediate return to the second level.

The three relegated teams were replaced by three 2007–08 Segunda División sides. Champions Numancia, who ended their second-level status after three years, runners-up Málaga, who returned to the top flight after two season in the second level, and Sporting de Gijón returned to the highest Spanish league after ten years.

Team information

Stadia and locations

Personnel and sponsoring

(*) Barcelona had no shirt sponsor during the 2008–09 season. Instead, following the signing of a five-year agreement with the humanitarian organisation UNICEF in 2006, the club sported the UNICEF logo on the front of its jersey while making an annual donation to the organisation.
(†) on the back of the shirt

Managerial changes

League table

Results

Awards

LaLiga Awards
For the first time in La Liga's history, its governing body, the Liga Nacional de Fútbol Profesional, honoured the competition's best players and coach with the LaLiga Awards.

Pichichi Trophy
The Pichichi Trophy is awarded to the player who scores the most goals in a season.

Source: Yahoo! Sport

Zamora Trophy
The Zamora Trophy is awarded by newspaper Marca to the goalkeeper with least goals-to-games ratio. A goalkeeper must play at least 28 games of 60 or more minutes to be eligible for the trophy.

Source: LFP

Fair Play award

Source: 2008–09 Fair Play Rankings Season.

Scoring
First goal of the season:   Luis García for Espanyol against Valladolid (30 August 2008)
Last goal of the season:   Ricardo Oliveira for Real Betis against Valladolid (31 May 2009)

Hat-tricks

4 Player scored four goals(H) - Home ; (A) - Away

Discipline
First yellow card of the season:  Grégory Béranger for Espanyol against Valladolid (30 August 2008)
First red card of the season:  Diego Godín for Villarreal against Osasuna (31 August 2008)

See also
 List of Spanish football transfers summer 2008
 List of Spanish football transfers winter 2008–09
 2008–09 Segunda División
 2008–09 Copa del Rey

References

External links

2008 2009
1